This is a list of fellows of the Royal Society elected in its 13th year, 1672.

Fellows 
Jean Dominique Cassini (1625–1712)
Sir Frescheville Holles (1642–1672)
Henry Howard (1655–1701)
Sir Isaac Newton	(1642–1727)
John Tillotson (1630–1694)
Francis Vernon (1637–1677)
Howard (unknown) (1655–1689)

References

1672
1672 in science
1672 in England